Abū Manṣūr Muwaffaq Harawī was a 10th-century Persian physician.

He flourished in Herat (modern-day Afghanistan), under the Samanid prince Mansur I, who ruled from 961 to 976.

He was apparently the first to think of compiling a treatise on materia medica in Persian; he travelled extensively in Persia and India to obtain the necessary information.

Abu Mansur distinguished between sodium carbonate and potassium carbonate, and seems to have had some knowledge about arsenious oxide, cupric oxide, silicic acid, and antimony; he knew the toxicological effects of copper and lead compounds, the depilatory vertue of quicklime, the composition of plaster of Paris, and its surgical use.

The book, al-Abniya
Between 968 and 977 C.E., Muwaffaq compiled his Book of the Remedies (Kitab al-Abniya 'an Haqa'iq al-Adwiya), which is the oldest prose work in New Persian. It is also the only work of his to survive into modern times. The book begins with an introductory general theory of pharmacology. The body of the work mainly deals with over five-hundred remedies (most of which are plant-based, however seventy-five come from minerals, and forty-four from animals); they are classified into four groups according to their physiological action. Muwaffaq was a consummate scholar, and cited Arab, Greek, Syrian and Ayurvedic authorities.

The oldest copy of this book that we have is from 1055, which was transcribed by Asadi Tusi, a famous poet, and is in the Austrian National Library.

See also
List of Iranian scientists

References

Works cited

Further reading
 Fonahn, A., Zuar Quellenkunde Persian medicine, Leipzig, 1910
 C. Elgood. In: A medical history of Persia from the earliest times to the year 1932 AD 1932, Cambridge University Press, London (1951), p. V.
 Muvaffak A, Gurhan I, Gunduz U, Hasirci N., J Drug Target. 2005 Apr;13(3):151-9.
 Muvaffak A, Hasirci N. Adv Exp Med Biol. 2003;534:309-25.
 Sarton, G., Introduction to the History of Science, Baltimore,1927

10th-century Iranian physicians
Pharmacologists of medieval Iran
Iranian inventors
Samanid scholars